Waiting Room to the Beyond ( and also known as Mark of the Tortoise) is a 1964 German thriller film directed by Alfred Vohrer and starring Hildegard Knef.

Cast
 Hildegard Knef as Lorelli
 Götz George as Donald 'Don' Micklem
 Richard Münch as Mario Orlandi di Alsconi
 Heinz Reincke as Inspektor Dickes
 Carl Lange as Crantor
 Pinkas Braun as Felix
 Adelheid Seeck as Lady Helen Bradley
 Hans Paetsch as Sir Cyrus Bradley
 Jan Hendriks as Carlos
 Klaus Kinski as Shapiro
 Hans Clarin as Harry Mason

References

External links

1964 films
1960s crime thriller films
German crime thriller films
West German films
1960s German-language films
German black-and-white films
Films based on works by James Hadley Chase
Films based on British novels
Films directed by Alfred Vohrer
Films produced by Horst Wendlandt
Films about kidnapping
1960s German films